Sir Gabriello Cecchi (Ponte Buggianese, 1914 – Torino, 2000) was an Italian entrepreneur in the gelato industry. He learned the trade from his father Raimondo and went on to perfect it in France. He created the Gelati Cecchi brand in 1936 and founded Cecchi Industries after the war, managing them up until 1973 when he sold the company to the Italian group Barilla.
After its sale, he remained Honorary chairman and Director of the Italian group and Motta-Nestlé up until the 1990s.  
The brand was relaunched by his grandson, Stefano Cecchi.

Cecchi was the patron of the A-series Pallacanestro Biella team and a co-founder of a Turin Bank. He was a member of the International Brigades that fought Francisco Franco's Fascist army in Spain during the Spanish Civil War and later, having returned to Italy, became a member of the Garibaldi 77th assault brigade fighting in the Italian Resistance.

Honours
 Commander of the Order of Merit of the Italian Republic
 Knight of the Order of Merit for Labour                                                                                                                                                    * Commander of Merit of the Military Order of St. Bridget of Sweden 
 The Cross of Commander de Premiere Classe du Merite of the Belgian Order of the Crown for philanthropy and meritorious acts
The Italian War Merit Cross following his role as a partisan in the liberation of the city of Turin

References

1914 births
2000 deaths